This is a list of wildlife sanctuaries in Pakistan recognized by IUCN.

Wildlife sanctuaries
Argam Basti Wildlife Sanctuary
Astore Wildlife Sanctuary
Bajwat Wildlife Sanctuary
Baltistan Wildlife Sanctuary
Bijoro Chach Wildlife Sanctuary
Borraka Wildlife Sanctuary
Buzi Makola Wildlife Sanctuary
Chashma and Taunsa Barrage Dolphin Sanctuary
Cholistan Wildlife Sanctuary
Chorani Wildlife Sanctuary
Chotiari Wetland
Chumbi Surla Wildlife Sanctuary
Cut Munarki Chach Wildlife Sanctuary
Daphar Wildlife Sanctuary
Deh Akro Wildlife Sanctuary
Dhoung Block Wildlife Sanctuary
Drigh Lake Wildlife Sanctuary
Dureji Wildlife Sanctuary
Ghondak Dhono Wildlife Sanctuary
Gullel Kohri Wildlife Sanctuary
Gulsher Dhand Wildlife Sanctuary
Hub Dam Wildlife Sanctuary
Hadero Lake Wildlife Sanctuary
Haleji Wildlife Sanctuary
Haleji Lake Wildlife Sanctuary
Islamabad Wildlife Sanctuary
Kachau Wildlife Sanctuary
Kargah Wildlife Sanctuary
Keti Bunder South Wildlife Sanctuary
Khadi Wildlife Sanctuary
Kharar Lake Wildlife Sanctuary
Khat Dhoro Wildlife Sanctuary
Kinjhar Lake Wildlife Sanctuary
Koh-e-Geish Wildlife Sanctuary
Kolwah Kap Wildlife Sanctuary
Kot Dinghano Wildlife Sanctuary
Lakhi Wildlife Sanctuary
Lehri Nature Park
Mahal Kohistan Wildlife Sanctuary
Majiran Wildlife Sanctuary
Manglot Wildlife Park
Manshi Wildlife Sanctuary
Marho Kotri Wildlife Sanctuary
Maslakh Wildlife Sanctuary
Mehrano Wildlife Sanctuary
Miani Dhand Wildlife Sanctuary
Mohabat Doro Wildlife Sanctuary
Munarki Wildlife Sanctuary
Naltar Wildlife Sanctuary
Nara Desert Wildlife Sanctuary
Nemal Lake Wildlife Sanctuary
Norange Wildlife Sanctuary
Overa Aru Wildlife Sanctuary
Raghai Rakhshan Wildlife Sanctuary
Ras Koh Wildlife Sanctuary
Rasool Barrage Wildlife Sanctuary
Rann of Kutch Wildlife Sanctuary
Sadnani Wildlife Sanctuary
Salkhala Wildlife Sanctuary
Salpara Wildlife Sanctuary
Samno Dhand Wildlife Sanctuary
Sasnamana Wildlife Sanctuary
Shah Lando Wildlife Sanctuary
Shashan Wildlife Sanctuary
Sheikh Buddin Wildlife Sanctuary
Sodhi Wildlife Sanctuary
Takkar Wildlife Sanctuary
Taunsa Barrage Wildlife Sanctuary
Ziarat Juniper Wildlife Sanctuary

See also
Game reserves of Pakistan
Forestry in Pakistan
List of National Parks of Pakistan
Wildlife of Pakistan

Further reading
Wildlife Sanctuaries of Pakistan at pakistanpaedia.com
Country profile at Earthtrends
Review of 'Protected Areas System' in Pakistan
Protected areas systems at wildlifeofpakistan.com

References

Pakistan profile at World Database on Protected Areas

External links
IUCN-Pakistan

Wildlife
Wildlife sanctuaries of Pakistan
Biota of Pakistan